The Battle of Shangcai was fought between the National Revolutionary Army and a coalition opposing Chiang Kai-shek. Both sides were part of the Kuomintang.

Bibliography
中華民國國防大學編，《中國現代軍事史主要戰役表》

Conflicts in 1930